Triphalangeal thumbs-brachyectrodactyly syndrome is a very rare limb malformation syndrome of genetic origin which is characterized by polydactyly, syndactyly, brachydactyly, ectrodactyly, triphalangeal thumb and polyphalangism. Onychodystrophy and anonychia are also seen often. 27 cases from seven families from Mexico and the United States have been described in medical literature. It is inherited in an autosomal dominan manner and thought to be caused by mutations in the HOXD13 gene, in chromosome 2.

References 

Genetic diseases and disorders